The December 2017 Kabul suicide bombing occurred on 28 December 2017, when militants attacked a Shiite cultural centre in Kabul, Afghanistan. The attack killed 50 people and injured over 80.

The major explosion of the attack occurred in the Tebyan Cultural centre (also spelled "Tabayan Cultural Centre" and "Tabian Cultural Centre"), a Shia cultural organisation, located in the Shia-dominated Dashte Barchi area of Kabul. The cultural centre also housed the Afghan Voice Agency, with victims including journalists and university students. The bombing occurred during a discussion held to mark the 38th anniversary of the Soviet invasion of Afghanistan. The interior ministry of Afghanistan stated that two other explosions occurred soon afterwards, but did not cause any fatalities. Among those killed were two children. Most of those injured were suffering from burns. Photographs taken by eyewitnesses showed significant damage to the targeted building.

The so-called Islamic State of Iraq and Levant (ISIL) claimed responsibility for the attack in an online statement released by the Amaq News Agency, operated by ISIL. The attack is among a series that has targeted Afghanistan's Shia minority, who are seen as heretics by the Islamic State. According to the United Nations, 12 attacks have targeted Shiites in Afghanistan since the beginning of 2016, in which more than 700 people have been killed. The Taliban denied responsibility for the attack soon after it occurred. Afghan President Ashraf Ghani described the incident as an "unpardonable" crime against humanity.

See also
 List of terrorist attacks in Kabul

References

2017 murders in Afghanistan
2017 in Kabul
December 2017 crimes in Asia
ISIL terrorist incidents in Afghanistan
Islamic terrorist incidents in 2017
Mass murder in 2017
Mass murder in Kabul
Mass murder in Afghanistan
Suicide bombings in 2017
Suicide bombings in Afghanistan
Terrorist incidents in Afghanistan in 2017
Terrorist incidents in Kabul
Violence against Shia Muslims in Afghanistan
Building bombings in Afghanistan